Hernán Gaspar Lorenzino (born March 5, 1972) is an Argentine lawyer and public policy maker. He was appointed Minister of Economy of Argentina by President Cristina Kirchner in 2011.

Life and times
Lorenzino was born in La Plata. His family moved to Puerto Madryn, Chubut Province, in 1974, and Lorenzino was raised in the coastal Patagonia city. He met his future wife there, and together they enrolled at the National University of La Plata, where Lorenzino earned a Law degree and a master's degree in public finance; he later earned a master's degree in Economics at Torcuato di Tella University.

He was appointed Provincial Director of Funding Policy and Public Credit for the Province of Buenos Aires by Governor Felipe Solá in 2004, during which tenure he managed the redemption of the remaining Patacón bonds issued as complementary currency by Governor Carlos Ruckauf during the depths of the 2001 crisis.

Following the end of Solá's administration in 2007, Lorenzino was appointed Financial Representative for Argentina in Washington, D.C. The resignation of Economy Minister Martín Lousteau amid the 2008 Argentine government conflict with the agricultural sector in April, led to Lorenzino's appointment as Secretary of Finance for the new Economy Minister, the more conciliatory Carlos Rafael Fernández. Lorenzino managed the second phase of the Argentine debt restructuring in this capacity; its first phase had been initiated in 2005 by Economy Minister Roberto Lavagna, and had resulted in the renegotiation of two-thirds of the US$82 billion in sovereign bonds defaulted in 2001. The second phase, involving the renegotiation of US$18 billion in bonds retained by holdouts from the 2005 exchange, was completed in June 2010. Holders of two-thirds of this latter tranche accepted the offer prepared by Lorenzino, and the proportion of bonds rescued from default thus rose to over 92%.

Lorenzino also served in La graN maKro, a center-left economic and social policy think tank closely allied with Kirchnerism. Enjoying a good working relationship with Economy Minister Amado Boudou, Lorenzino was nominated to replace him when the latter was elected Vice President of Argentina in President Cristina Kirchner's landslide, 2011 reelection. Lorenzino was, moreover, the most pragmatic major official in Boudou's team with regards to the international bond market and the Paris Club of creditors, and the Minister-designate subsequently announced that debt restructuring would be acquire a greater policy relevance during his tenure.

An April 2013 interview by Greek journalist Eleni Varvitsioti resulted in a stir when Lorenzino refused to answer a question regarding Argentine inflation; unbeknownst to him, the microphones were left on and recorded him saying me quiero ir ("I want to leave"). He then departed, leaving the interview unfinished, baffling both the local and the international press.

Lorenzino's tenure was marked by ongoing efforts to counter vulture fund lawsuits to obtain payment at face value on nearly USD1.5 billion of bonds bought for pennies on the dollar. The Argentine offer prepared by Lorenzino, based on his successful 2010 restructuring, would give the largest of the vulture funds, Caymans-based NML Capital Limited, a 284% return; NML had filed injunctions in U.S. courts to attach future payments to other bondholders by way of forcing Argentina to settle and thus obtain returns of up to 1380%.

Cristina Kirchner appointed Axel Kicillof as the new minister of economy on November 18, 2013. Lorenzino was sent in a task force to negotiate the Argentine debt restructuring.

References

External links
Minsterio de Economía y Finanzas Publicas 

1972 births
Living people
People from La Plata
People from Puerto Madryn
Argentine people of Italian descent
National University of La Plata alumni
20th-century Argentine lawyers
Argentine Ministers of Finance